Kalanchoe bentii is a subshrub that grows in Somalia and Yemen.

References

bentii
Flora of Somalia
Flora of Yemen
Plants described in 1901